Maksim Vladimirovich Oberemko (born 25 January 1978) is a Ukrainian (until 2014) and Russian (since 2015) windsurfer. He has competed for Ukraine at the Olympics since 1996, firstly in the Mistral One Design class, and later in the RS:X class.

Results

References

External links
 
 
 

1978 births
Living people
Ukrainian emigrants to Russia
Naturalised citizens of Russia
Russian male sailors (sport)
Russian windsurfers
Ukrainian male sailors (sport)
Ukrainian windsurfers
Olympic sailors of Ukraine
Sailors at the 1996 Summer Olympics – Mistral One Design
Sailors at the 2000 Summer Olympics – Mistral One Design
Sailors at the 2004 Summer Olympics – Mistral One Design
Sailors at the 2008 Summer Olympics – RS:X
Sailors at the 2012 Summer Olympics – RS:X
Sailors at the 2016 Summer Olympics – RS:X
Olympic sailors of Russia